Guam Highway 18 (GH-18) is one of the primary automobile highways in the United States territory of Guam.

Route description
In spite of its main highway designation, GH-18 is a short spur route, running westward from GH-1 across from the Guam Veterans Cemetery and along onto Drydock Island, a small peninsula located in the middle of Apra Harbor and just to the south of Cabras Island. This peninsula forms the northern edge of Sasa Bay; its south edge is formed by Polaris Point, a Naval site. The waters of Sasa Bay are a marine preserve, making the peninsula a tourist attraction. The peninsula is home to the Marianas Yacht Club, several public beaches, and an Atlantis tourist submarine. Route 18 ends at a dead-end at the west edge of the peninsula.

Major intersections

References

18